Oga! Pastor is a Nigerian drama web series by NdaniTV which was released on NdaniTV's YouTube page in June 2019. The show which was created and written by Lani Aisida ran for 3 episodes until it was canceled by the channel.

Plot summary
Oga! Pastor follows the life of Deoye Gesinde, a young clergyman and founder of a fast-growing Church, GGBC. Deoye struggles with balancing the needs of his family, the needs of the Church, and his own personal needs. The tough balancing act soon keeps him in the bondage of people's expectations and the high standards he has set for himself.

Cast 
Uzor Arukwe as Deoye Gesinde
Ini Dima-Okojie as Laitan Gesinde
Pearl Okorie as Moji
Jimmy Odukoya as Kunle
Tolulope Odewunmi 
Demi Banwo as Vincent

Episodes

Cancellation
After airing 3 episodes, NdaniTV canceled the series and removed the uploaded episodes from YouTube. This occurred following a sexual assault allegation against a Nigerian pastor, Biodun Fatoyinbo and it led to speculations that the takedown was related to the situation even though the series aired before that. Ndani TV did not issue an official statement.

References

External links

2010s Nigerian television series
English-language television shows
Nigerian drama television series
Drama web series
2019 web series debuts
Ndani TV original programming